Quanera Hayes (born March 7, 1992) is an American sprinter specializing in the 400 meters distance. She won the bronze medal at the 2016 World Indoor Championships and is the 2020 US Olympic Trials champion in the women's 400 m. She has earned several gold medals for the United States in the 4 × 400 m relay, including at the World Championships and World Relays in 2017, as well as the World Indoor Championships in 2016 and 2018. A 400m 2021 Diamond League champion.

Early life
Hayes was born March 7, 1992. She was raised in her hometown of Hope Mills, North Carolina and attended Livingstone College in Salisbury, North Carolina, competing for the NCAA Division II track and field team from 2012 until 2015 when she graduated.

Professional track career
Hayes won the women's 400 m at the United States Olympic Trials on June 20, 2021, qualifying for the delayed 2020 Summer Olympics with a seasonal best time of 49.78 seconds ahead of Allyson Felix.

Personal life
As of June 20, 2021, she had a 2-year-old son named Demetrius.

Competition record

Information from World Athletics profile.

Circuit wins and titles
  Diamond League champion (400 m): 2021
 2021 (1) (400 m): Zürich Weltklasse

Personal bests

Information from World Athletics profile.

References

1992 births
Living people
American female sprinters
African-American female track and field athletes
Livingstone College alumni
Track and field athletes from North Carolina
World Athletics Championships athletes for the United States
World Athletics Championships medalists
Track and field athletes from South Carolina
People from Hope Mills, North Carolina
World Athletics Indoor Championships winners
USA Outdoor Track and Field Championships winners
USA Indoor Track and Field Championships winners
World Athletics Indoor Championships medalists
World Athletics Championships winners
Athletes (track and field) at the 2020 Summer Olympics
Olympic female sprinters
Olympic track and field athletes of the United States
Diamond League winners
21st-century African-American sportspeople
21st-century African-American women